is a  platform video game developed and published by Epoch Co. for the Nintendo 64. It was released only in Japan in 1997. The game is based on the Japanese manga Doraemon and has two Nintendo 64 sequels, Doraemon 2: Nobita to Hikari no Shinden and Doraemon 3: Nobita no Machi SOS!, both only released in Japan.

The Devil character was designed by Akira Toriyama.

Story
Long ago the Devil was sealed away by the powers of the Three Fairy Spirit Stones. These stones created a barrier which he could not pass, then one day the stones shatter and he escapes, resuming his war on the Fairy World people. The Princess of the Sky portion of this world was then asked by her father to go to the Human World and return with Doraemon's four-dimensional pouch. She arrives in the Human World to get Doraemon's pouch, but as she does the Evil King comes, in the form of a bat, and steals it. The princess chases the bat back into her world and disappears. Doraemon, Nobita, and friends decide to follow her and see if they can get back his pouch. When arriving they find that the formerly-human looking princess now has the body of a small fairy, complete with wings. She tells them that she was changed into this form by the Devil, and that she got Doraemon's pouch back, but in the struggle all his useful items were lost, among the three areas of Fairy World; Earth, Sea and Sky.

Gameplay
Each of the three main areas of the game has four levels, three of them contain pieces of that area's Fairy Spirit Stone, and the fourth a Castle where that area's king is imprisoned. Each king has the power to put their areas stone back together. In order to reach the Devil all three stones must be repaired. The game for most levels is a standard platform game with jumping and shooting. There are four other levels that are played in different ways. (1) Meet and ride in the pouch of a Kangaroo-like Dinosaur. (2) Race a car in an under water course. (3) Ride on the back of a bird-like dragon that can shoot balls of fire, as enemies fall from the top of the screen. (4) Fly using a hat that has a spinning propeller on its top. The main character that is being used to play can be switched by pausing the game and selecting another character, each has their own unique abilities, a sixth character the princess Corona, whose name also means sun's outer layer Corona, can also be unlocked as a playable character once the game has been beaten. Small voice clips from the cartoon actors can be heard when starting any of the levels or when the character is defeated. Many of the boss enemies come from other cultures such as a Minotaur, Harpy, Centaur, and an evil version of Santa Claus. As the demo story plays a Pentagram is seen as the Devil is released form is barrier. The text of the game is entirely in Japanese and appears in a window bar at the bottom of the screen along with an image of the person that it speaking, the image changes when the person is happy, sad, or another person is talking.

External links
Walk Through and Translation by "Teary Eyes" Anderson at IGN.com 
Mobygames.com Review.

References

Nobita to Mittsu no Seireiseki
1997 video games
Epoch Co. games
Japan-exclusive video games
Nintendo 64 games
Nintendo 64-only games
3D platform games
Video games developed in Japan